The 2004 Northeast Conference baseball tournament began on May 21 and ended on May 23, 2004, at FirstEnergy Park in Lakewood, New Jersey.  The league's top four teams competed in the double elimination tournament.  Top-seeded  won their third consecutive, and third overall, tournament championship and earned the Northeast Conference's automatic bid to the 2004 NCAA Division I baseball tournament.

Seeding and format
The top four finishers were seeded one through four based on conference regular-season winning percentage.

Bracket

Most Valuable Player
Evan Scribner of Central Connecticut was named Tournament Most Valuable Player.  Scribner pitched in four of the five tournament games that Central Connecticut played in.

References

Tournament
Northeast Conference Baseball Tournament
Northeast Conference baseball tournament
Northeast Conference baseball tournament